Gregory Beylkin (born 16 March 1953) is an applied mathematician.

Education and career
He studied from 1970 to 1975 at the University of Leningrad, with Diploma in Mathematics in November 1975. From 1976 to 1979 he was a research scientist at the Research Institute of Ore Geophysics, Leningrad. From 1980 to 1982 he was a graduate student at New York University, where he received his PhD under the supervision of Peter Lax. From 1982 to 1983 Beylkin was an associate research scientist at the Courant Institute of Mathematical Sciences. From 1983 to 1991 he was a member of the professional staff of Schlumberger-Doll Research in Ridgefield, Connecticut. Since 1991 he has been a professor in the Department of Applied Mathematics at the University of Colorado Boulder. He was a visiting professor at Yale University, the University of Minnesota, and the Mittag-Leffler Institute and participated in 2012 and 2015 in the summer seminar on "Applied Harmonic Analysis and Sparse Approximation" at Oberwolfach. He is the author or co-author of over 100 articles in refereed journal and has served on several editorial boards.

Awards and honors
 1998 — Invited Speaker of the International Congress of Mathematicians
 2012 — Fellow of the American Mathematical Society
 2016 — Fellow of the Society for Industrial and Applied Mathematics

Patents

See also

References

External links

1953 births
Living people
20th-century Russian mathematicians
21st-century Russian mathematicians
20th-century American mathematicians
21st-century American mathematicians
Applied mathematicians
Fellows of the American Mathematical Society
Fellows of the Society for Industrial and Applied Mathematics
Saint Petersburg State University alumni
New York University alumni
University of Colorado Boulder alumni